Ramvik is a locality situated in Härnösand Municipality in Västernorrland County, Sweden with 691 inhabitants in 2010. Before 2015, part of the locality belonged to Kramfors Municipality. Also in 2015, the urban area was divided and the northern part around Ramvik formed a small town, while the southern part around Hälledal formed a separate urban area that took over the urban area code from Ramvik.

Ramvik was the home of Swedish politician Thorbjörn Fälldin.

References 

Populated places in Härnösand Municipality
Populated places in Kramfors Municipality
Ångermanland